Hatkanangle Lok Sabha constituency is one of the 48 Lok Sabha (parliamentary) constituencies in Maharashtra state in western India. This constituency was dissolved as a part of the implementation of delimitation in 1976. This constituency again came into existence in 2008 as a part of the implementation of delimitation of parliamentary constituencies based on the recommendations of the Delimitation Commission of India constituted on 12 July 2002. Vidhan Sabha segments from Sangli and Kolhapur districts have formed this new constituency.

As of 2019 the eligible voters are 17,72,563 including 914358 males, 858138 females and 67 others.

Assembly segments
After the 2008 delimitation, Hatkanangle Lok Sabha constituency comprises six Vidhan Sabha (legislative assembly) segments. These segments are:

Members of Parliament

Election results

General elections 2019

General elections 2014

General elections 2009

See also
 Ichalkaranji Lok Sabha constituency
 Kolhapur district
 Sangli district
 List of Constituencies of the Lok Sabha

References

External links
 Hatkanangle lok sabha  constituency election 2019 results details

Lok Sabha constituencies in Maharashtra
Lok Sabha constituencies in Maharashtra created in 2008
Sangli district
Kolhapur district